The BBC Nine O'Clock News was the flagship BBC News programme. It was launched on 14 September 1970 and ran until 13 October 2000, when it was replaced by the BBC Ten O'Clock News.

History
The Nine O'Clock News was the BBC's flagship TV news bulletin throughout its run but the format changed significantly over its 30 years.

The time of the bulletin was significant though coincidental—during World War II the Nine O'Clock News on the BBC Home Service was hugely important.

The first week of the TV bulletin was presented by Robert Dougall, followed by Richard Baker and Kenneth Kendall, each presenting five consecutive nightly bulletins. The choice of these three was significant, echoing the original BBC television bulletins of 1955, which they had also presented.

Other notable presenters included John Edmunds, Peter Woods, Richard Whitmore, Angela Rippon, Jan Leeming, John Humphrys, John Simpson, Sue Lawley, Julia Somerville, Andrew Harvey,  Moira Stuart, Nicholas Witchell, Martyn Lewis, Michael Buerk, Peter Sissons and George Alagiah.

Between 13 November 1972 to 5 March 1976 and again between 2 September 1985 to 30 October 1988, the programme had two presenters.

In 1981, traditional BBC "newsreaders" such as Richard Baker stopped presenting the Nine O'Clock News regularly and were replaced by journalists—initially John Humphries and John Simpson. However, the two most significant revamps happened on 2 September 1985 and 30 October 1988.

As well as changes to presentation, the 1985 relaunch gave the bulletin its own signature tune—distinct from that of other BBC News bulletins. Computer graphics were also introduced.

The 31 October 1988 revamp was about content as well as style. An increasing emphasis was placed on analysis and specialist journalism. At the same time the programme reverted to a single presenter. At this point in time, the programme was typically 28 minutes long.

The programme moved to ten o'clock on 16 October 2000 but in other respects changed little.

The Nine O'Clock News replaced The Main News at 8:45pm, in a response to the launch by ITN of the News at Ten. It was the first bulletin to have a closing set of music; other bulletins would show weather forecasts at the end instead. The set used by the bulletin was designed to differentiate from the day's bulletins; an example of this was on 7 September 1981, where the Nine O'Clock bulletin had a wooden effect whereas other bulletins used a plain blue background instead.

On 13 April 1993, all the BBC News bulletins were relaunched with a more uniform look. This programme and some others were given a darker set and a stereo orchestral version of the previous mono title music. A more comprehensive relaunch of all the BBC News output came on 10 May 1999, after which this programme once again shared a common theme and set with its daytime counterpart.

Between 10 May 1999 to 13 October 2000, the programme was advertised as the BBC News at Nine. The final bulletin, before the transition to the BBC Ten O'Clock News (2000–present), was presented by George Alagiah in Jerusalem and Peter Sissons in London.

The programme was broadcast on BBC1 and inspired a BBC2 comedy show running in the same time slot, Not the Nine O'Clock News.

External links
 

1970 British television series debuts
1970s British television series
1980s British television series
1990s British television series
2000 British television series endings
Lost BBC episodes
BBC television news shows
Flagship evening news shows